Youcef Touati (29 March 1989 – 16 March 2017) was an Algerian professional footballer who played as an attacking midfielder.

Club career

Youth career
Born in Saint-Denis, Touati began his career bouncing around the junior ranks of several different clubs: ES Paris, Red Star 93, CS Sedan and Paris FC. In 2005, at age 16, he joined the Amiens SC academy where he stayed for two years. In 2007, the club offered Touati a professional trainee contract but, on the advice of his agent, he declined it to go join Spanish side Villareal CF. However, he was unable to sign with Villareal since the club was not willing to pay Amiens for the transfer. Touati finally returned to Amiens four months later, this time to sign with the city's other team, AC Amiens.

Pacy VEF
At the beginning of the 2008 season, Touati signed a contract with Championnat National side Pacy Vallée-d'Eure. However, AC Amiens claimed that the player was still under contract with the club, forcing him to sit out the first four months of the season. The clubs finally reached an agreement in December 2008 allowing Touati to feature for Pacy. He made 18 appearances for the club in the 2008–09 season, scoring one goal.

Dijon
On 6 July 2009, Touati signed a three-year contract with Ligue 2 side Dijon FCO. On 7 August 2009, he made his debut for the club starting in a league match against Angers SCO.

Cannes
On 9 September 2010, Touati was loaned out to Championnat National side AS Cannes until the end of the season.

International career
On 14 September 2009, Touati received his first call up to the Algerian Under-23 National Team for a 10-day training camp in Marseille. On 9 February 2011, he played his first match for the team, a 3–2 win over Senegal in a friendly in Sidi Moussa. However, after the game, head coach Azzedine Aït Djoudi said that Touati would be dropped from the team after showing a lack of motivation.

Death
After a traffic accident at the A1 autoroute on 6 March 2017, Touati's death was announced by various sources, including one of his previous clubs. However, it was announced by his family on 9 March 2017 that he survived the accident, being instead in a deep coma according to an official statement released by his family. Touati eventually died on 16 March.  He was 27.

Career statistics

References

1989 births
2017 deaths
Sportspeople from Saint-Denis, Seine-Saint-Denis
Association football midfielders
Algerian footballers
Algeria under-23 international footballers
French footballers
French sportspeople of Algerian descent
Dijon FCO players
Pacy Ménilles RC players
AS Cannes players
Red Star F.C. players
FC Istres players
Tours FC players
SAS Épinal players
FC Chambly Oise players
MO Béjaïa players
Ligue 2 players
Championnat National players
Footballers from Seine-Saint-Denis